Zenobia Powell Perry (October 3, 1908 – January 17, 2004) was an American composer, professor and civil rights activist. She taught in a number of historically black colleges and universities and composed in a style that writer Jeannie Gayle Pool called "music with clear, classic melodies." Her work has been performed by the Cleveland Chamber Symphony, the Detroit Symphony and West Virginia University Band and Orchestra.

Biography

Early life and education

Perry was born Zenobia Powell in the once-predominantly African-American town of Boley, Oklahoma to a physician, Dr. Calvin B. Powell and Birdie Thompson Powell (who had some Creek Indian heritage). Her family was well educated and middle class. Her grandfather, who had been a slave, sang her traditional spirituals as a child, which later influenced her work.

As a child, Perry met Booker T. Washington and sang for him at his appearance in Boley on August 22, 1915, where he "declared she was a future Tuskegegian." Perry took piano lessons as a child with Mayme Jones, who had been taught by Robert Nathaniel Dett. She won a piano competition in 1919. Perry also learned to play violin as a child. One of her biggest musical influences, however, came from the experience of hearing Hazel Harrison in concert, after which she knew she wanted to study music.

In 1925, Perry graduated from Boley High School. Her father was not supportive of her decision to study music, but her mother was, and sent her to Omaha, Nebraska, to study at the Cecil Berryman Conservatory in 1929. After her return to Boley, Dett visited her family to ask them to send her to the Hampton Institute, where she could study with him. However, soon after, Dett left Hampton for the Eastman School of Music and Perry decided on her own to study privately with Dett in Rochester, New York. Perry studied with Dett until May 1932. She studied composition briefly during this time with Cortez Reece at Langston University in Oklahoma. 

In 1935, she went on to study the Tuskegee Institute, and, because of her family's connection with Washington and her promise to study education as well as music, she was allowed to attend. At Tuskegee she studied with William L. Dawson who encouraged her to compose original work; she was already preparing arrangements for the Tuskegee Institute Chorus. Perry graduated in 1938.

After Tuskegee, Perry became part of a teacher training program for Black Americans that was headed by Eleanor Roosevelt. Roosevelt would become a mentor and friend to Perry and even helped sponsor her graduate studies. In 1941 she took classes at the Colorado State Teachers College and started teaching first grade in 1942. In 1945, she received her Master of Arts degree from Colorado State College.

She began "earnestly" writing her own music during the 1950s. From 1952 to 1954, Perry worked on her master's degree in music in composition at Wyoming University, where she studied under Allan Arthur Willman, Darius Milhaud and Charles Jones.

Career
Perry worked as a professor for much of her life and began seriously composing when she was in her forties. From 1941 to 1945 Perry taught while attending the Colorado State Teachers College. Two years later, she held a faculty position at the University of Arkansas at Pine Bluff (UAPB), where she remained until 1955. During the years of 1949 and until she left UAPB, Perry toured with Kelton Lawrence as a piano duo in order to recruit students for UAPB.

From 1955 to 1982, she was a faculty member and composer-in-residence at Central State University, in Wilberforce, Ohio. She continued to volunteer "on behalf of the African American community" after she retired.

In 1998 she was honored by the University of Wyoming, winning the Arts and Sciences Outstanding Alumni Award.

Work 

Perry's music is classical and "incorporates contrapuntal, tonal, mild dissonance, with some jazz and folk influence." According to biography Jeannie Gayle Poole, she was "also influenced by black American and Native American folklore, music, language and poetry." She wrote an opera, Tawawa House, first performed in 1987 and revived in 2014. Perry also wrote for orchestra, bands and composed a mass.

Archival collection 
Zenobia Powell Perry's papers are held at the Center for Black Music Research at Columbia College in Chicago. The collection is titled Zenobia Powell Perry Scores and Music Manuscripts. The collection as a whole consists primarily of original compositions and manuscripts produced by Powell herself.

Her pedagogical piano works are included in the University of Colorado at Boulder's Hidden Voices: Piano Music by Black Women Composers.

Personal life
In 1932, Zenobia Powell married violinist "King" Earl Gaynor. While she was pregnant, Gaynor left and she raised their son on her own. They later divorced in 1933. Her son, Lemuel, died in 1944 at age 11 of a ruptured appendix. In 1941, she married Jimmie Rogers Perry and they had a daughter, Janis, in 1943. Perry was divorced again while her daughter was young. Perry raised her daughter alone while working towards her advanced degrees and studies and also while also working as a professor. Perry also supported her elderly mother for many years. 

In 1962, she joined the NAACP to aid in the civil rights struggle.

In 1989 she was diagnosed and treated for breast cancer, and her health deteriorated until her death. She died January 17, 2004, at the age of 95.

Works List

Choral 
O Peter, Go Ring Dem Bells (SATB choir and chamber orchestra)

O Christians, What Cha Gonna Do? (SATB choir and chamber orchestra)

Kingdom's Coming (SATB choir and chamber orchestra)

Jubilee: Fare You Well (SATB chorus, Tenor and bass soloists, and chamber orchestra)

Didn't My Lord Deliver Daniel (soprano solo, SATB chorus and chamber orchestra)

A Wheel in a Wheel (SATB Chorus and chamber orchestra)

Vocal 
Threnody song cycle for soprano

They Call the Sun Ol' Hannah (baritone and chamber orchestra)

Shine Along (baritone and chamber orchestra)

Sinna Man, So Hard, Believe! (tenor and chamber orchestra)

Oh I Wan Two Wings (soprano and orchestra)

I Gotta Move When the Spirit Say Move (baritone and orchestra)

I Am a Poor Wayfaring Stranger (soprano and orchestra)

Hallelujah to the Lamb (tenor and chamber orchestra)

Follow the Drinking Gourd (baritone and orchestra)

I Gotta Home in Dat Rock (soprano and orchestra)

O de Angels Down Bowed Down (high voice and piano)

Kid Stuff (soprano and piano)

The Cottage (soprano and chamber orchestra/piano)

How Charming is the Place (soprano and organ/piano)

Trouble, Trouble (baritone and chamber orchestra)

Songs on Poems by Paul Laurence Dunbar for High Voice

The Hidden Words of Baha'u'llab (soprano, flute and piano)

Instrumental 
String Quartet no. 1

Three Designs for Four Strings

Two Letters for Clarinet, Cello and Piano

Three Pieces for Horn and Piano

Pastels for orchestra

Mass in F-sharp minor

Sonatine for Clarinet and Piano

Four Seasons for Clarinet and Piano

Four Mynyms for Three Players (flute, oboe/clarinet and piano)

Piano 
Vignette no. 1 

Vignette no. 2 

Times Seven 

Ties 

Teeta 

Sonatine 

Soliloquy 

Round and Round 

Rhapsody 

Promenade

Pavanne 

Nocturne 

A Jazz Trifle 

Flight 

Childhood Capers 

Blaize

Character matters 

Orrin and Echo 

Suite from Tawawa House (piano 4-hands)

Honors
Her most important honors include:

1999 Woman of the Year Award, Paul Laurence Dunbar House State Memorial, Dayton, Ohio.
2002 Member of the American Society of Composers, Authors and Publishers.
2003 Elizabeth Mathias Award from the Mu Phi Epsilon fraternity of professional musicians.

Awards from Ohio institutions for her life achievements and contributions to Ohio culture.
1987 Honored with a Music Citation for distinguished service to Ohio in the field of music at the Ohioans Library Association.
1988 Honored by Ohio National Organization of Women at the NOW Banquet in Columbus, as a part of their second annual women's history celebration.
1991 Inducted into the Greene County [Ohio] Women's Hall of Fame
1993 Inducted in Ohio Senior Citizens Hall of Fame
1998 Named as one of Top Ten women for 1998 by Dayton Daily News.
1999 Woman of the Year Award, Paul Laurence Dunbar House State Memorial, Dayton, Ohio.
2000 Named 2000 Outstanding Senior Citizen of Green County, Ohio.
2002 Cultural Arts Award for outstanding contributions in the field of Music Education, National Afro-American Museum, Wilberforce, Ohio.

Read more

References

External links

 Zenobia Powell Perry memorial website
 Zenobia Powell Perry Scores and Music Manuscripts – a finding aid
 https://www.colorado.edu/project/hidden-voices/zenobia-powell-perry 
 https://www.explorepinebluff.com/post/meet-zenobia-powell-perry
 https://www.aseatatthepiano.com/composers/zenobia-powell-perry
  

African-American classical composers
American classical composers
African-American women classical composers
Musicians from Dayton, Ohio
People from Boley, Oklahoma
Musicians from Oklahoma
Wilberforce University faculty
University of Arkansas at Pine Bluff faculty
University of Northern Colorado faculty
University of Wyoming alumni
Tuskegee University alumni
1908 births
2004 deaths
Pupils of Darius Milhaud
American women classical composers
American music arrangers
20th-century American women musicians
African-American women musicians